La Aventura Explosiva is a 1977 Argentine action comedy film directed by Ricardo Bauleo and Orestes Trucco and written by Salvador Valverde Calvo.  The film starred Víctor Bó. The cinematography was performed by Juan Carlos Desanzo.

Plot 
Government agents guard the inventor of a new type of fuel which only works at a specific speed.

Cast 
 Ricardo Bauleo - Tiburón
 Víctor Bó - Delfín
 Julio De Grazia - Mojarrita
 Thelma Stefani - Victoria
 Aldo Barbero
 Hugo Caprera
 Adriana Costantini
 Juan Carlos de Seta
 Emilio Disi
 Enrique Kossi
 Arturo Maly
 Pablo Palitos
 Rodolfo Ranni
 Jorge Villalba

External links 
 

1977 films
1970s Spanish-language films
1970s action comedy films
Argentine action comedy films
1977 comedy films
1970s Argentine films

References